The commodity status of animals is the legal status as property of most non-human animals, particularly farmed animals, working animals and animals in sport, and their use as objects of trade. In the United States, free-roaming animals (ferae naturae) are (broadly) held in trust by the state; only if captured can be claimed as personal property.

Animals regarded as commodities may be bought, sold, given away, bequeathed, killed, and used as commodity producers: producers of meat, eggs, milk, fur, wool, skin and offspring, among other things. The exchange value of the animal does not depend on quality of life.

The commodity status of livestock is evident in auction yards, where they are tagged with a barcode and traded according to certain qualities, including age, weight, sex and breeding history.

In commodity markets, animals and animal products are classified as soft commodities, along with goods such as coffee and sugar, because they are grown, as opposed to hard commodities, such as gold and copper, which are mined.

Researchers identify viewing animals as commodities by humans as a manifestation of speciesism. The vegan and animal rights movements, chiefly the abolitionist approach, of the twentieth century calls for eliminating the commodity or property status of animals.

History and law

Animals, when owned, are classified as personal property (movable property not attached to real property/real estate). The word cattle derives from the French word cheptel or Old French word chatel, or personal property.

Historian Joyce E. Salisbury writes that the relationship between humans and animals was always expressed in terms of control, and the idea that animals become property by being domesticated. She notes that Saint Ambrose (340–397) held the view that God controlled wild animals while humanity controlled the rest. Isidore of Seville (560–636) distinguished between "cattle", a term for animals that had been domesticated, and "beasts" or wild animals, as did Thomas Aquinas (1225–1274).

The English jurist William Blackstone (1723–1780) wrote of domesticated animals, in Commentaries on the Laws of England (1765–1769):

In such as are of a nature tame and domestic (as horses, kine [cows], sheep, poultry, and the like), a man may have as absolute a property as in any inanimate beings ... because these continue perpetually in his occupation, and will not stray from his house or person, unless by accident or fraudulent entitlement, in either of which cases the owner does not lose his property ...

That wild animals belong in common to everyone, or to the state, and can become personal property only if captured, is known as the "animals ferae naturae" doctrine. Blackstone wrote of wild animals that they are either "not the objects of property at all, or else fall under our other division, namely, that of qualified, limited, or special property, which is such as is not in its nature permanent, but may sometimes subsist, and at other times not subsist."

Sentience

Writing about wild animals being imported into France in the 18th century, historian Louise Robbins writes that a "cultural biography of things" would show animals "sliding in and out of commodity status and taking on different values for different people" as they make their way from their homes to the streets of Paris. Sociologist Rhoda Wilkie has used the term "sentient commodity" to describe this view of how the conception of animals as commodities can shift depending on whether a human being forms a relationship with them. Geographers Rosemary-Claire Collard and Jessica Dempsey use the term "lively commodities".

Political scientist Sami Torssonen argues that animal welfare has itself been commodified since the 1990s because of public concern for animals. "Scientifically-certified welfare products", which Torssonen calls "sellfare", are "producible and salable at various points in the commodity chain", subject to competition like any other commodity. Social scientist Jacy Reese Anthis argues that, while there is no immanent right for animals or humans to not be commodified, there are strong practical reasons to oppose any commodification of animals, not just that which is cruel or egregious.

Commodification of nonhuman animals is one of the primary impacts of the animal–industrial complex. In the book Education for Total Liberation, Meneka Repka cites Barbara Noske as saying that the commodification of nonhuman animals in food systems is directly linked to capitalist systems that prioritize "monopolistically inclined financial interests" over the well-being of humans, nonhumans, and the environment. Richard Twine furthers this stating that "corporate influences have had a direct interest through marketing, advertising, and flavour manipulation in constructing the consumption of animal products as a sensual material pleasure."

See also

Animal–industrial complex
Animal rights
Commodification
Live export
Keeble v Hickeringill
Pierson v. Post
Ratione soli
Veganism

Notes

Footnotes

References

Further reading
External links
"United Nations Commodity Trade Statistics Database", UN ComTrade (live animals; meat and edible offal; fish; dairy products; products of animal origin)

Books, papers
Pedersen, Helena; Staescu, Vasile. "Conclusion: Future Directions for Critical Animal Studies", in Nik Taylor, Richard Twine (eds.), The Rise of Critical Animal Studies: From the Margins to the Centre, London: Routledge, 2014, pp. 262–276.
Francione, Gary. Animals, Property and the Law, Philadelphia, PA: Temple University Press, 1995.
Richards, John F. The World Hunt: An Environmental History of the Commodification of Animals, University of California Press, 2014.
Steiner, Gary. Animals and the Limits of Postmodernism, New York: Columbia University Press, 2013.

Animal law
Animal rights
Animal welfare
Commodities
Livestock
Pets
Property law
Veganism